The Boston Brawlers were a professional American football team based in Boston, Massachusetts. The team was based at Harvard Stadium in Cambridge, Massachusetts as the Boston Brawlers, and were a charter member of the Fall Experimental Football League (FXFL), which tried to become the developmental league for the National Football League. Their primary colors were red, midnight blue and white, similar to Major League Baseball's Boston Red Sox, and its logo featured a mustachioed, bare-fisted boxer.

The team never found an owner willing to keep the team in Boston. The league confirmed it would not return to Boston for the 2015 season, reassigned coach Terry Shea to the Brooklyn Bolts, and relocated the franchise to Niles, Ohio where the team was to be called the Mahoning Valley Brawlers, as the city is well known for boxing. The Brawlers would have been the first outdoor professional football team to call the Mahoning Valley home since the Youngstown Patricians, a prominent team in the Ohio League of the 1910s. The team had hired Montreal Alouettes offensive coordinator Rick Worman to be head coach for the 2015 season. However, on September 28, 2015, a week before the first scheduled game, the FXFL informed the Brawlers' franchisee (the Mahoning Valley Scrappers baseball team) that the Brawlers would not be taking part in the 2015 season. The Scrappers indicated, while not revealing any details, that the league did not have enough money to operate four teams for the 2015 season.

Results

2014 season

Logos

Final roster

References

External links

 Official Mahoning Valley Brawlers website
 Official Twitter page

 
American football teams established in 2014
American football teams in Ohio
Fall Experimental Football League teams
2014 establishments in Massachusetts